Gymnopodium is a genus of plants in the family Polygonaceae with three species of shrubs in Central America.

References 

Polygonaceae genera